Hawthorne Army Depot (HWAD) is a U.S. Army Joint Munitions Command ammunition storage depot located near the town of Hawthorne in western Nevada in the United States. It is directly south of Walker Lake. HWAD is the "World's Largest Depot". It is divided into three ammunition storage and production areas, plus an industrial area housing command headquarters, facilities, engineering shops, etc.

Background
Hawthorne Army Depot stores reserve ammunitions to be used after the first 30 days of a major conflict.  It is only partially staffed during peacetime, but provision has been made to rapidly expand staffing as necessary.  An independent contractor runs the depot under an agreement with the government.

The center's capabilities include demilitarization, desert training for military units, ammunition renovation, quality assurance, ISO intermodal container maintenance/repair, and range scrap processing.

History

The Naval Ammunition Depot Hawthorne was established in September 1930. It was redesignated Hawthorne Army Ammunition Plant in 1977 when it transferred to Army control as part of the Single Manager for Conventional Ammunition. In 1994, it ended its production mission and became Hawthorne Army Depot.

The depot began its existence as the Hawthorne Naval Ammunition Depot (NAD). It was established after a major disaster occurred at the Lake Denmark Naval Ammunition Depot, in New Jersey, in 1926. The accident virtually destroyed the depot, causing heavy damage to adjacent Picatinny Arsenal and the surrounding communities, killing 21 people, and seriously injuring 53 others. The monetary loss to the Navy alone was $84 million, just over $1 billion today (mostly in consumed explosives). As a result of a full-scale Congressional investigation, the seventieth Congress in 1928 directed establishing a Board of Officers to provide oversight of the storage conditions of explosives. A court of inquiry investigating the explosion recommended that a depot be established in a remote area within  of the west coast to serve the Pacific area.

Construction began on Hawthorne NAD in July 1928, and NAD received its first shipment of high explosives on 19 October 1930. When the United States entered World War II, the Depot became the staging area for bombs, rockets, and ammunition for almost the entire war effort. Employment was at its highest at 5,625 in 1945. Subsequently, excess Navy lands were turned over to the Bureau of Land Management.

The U.S. Marine Corps provided security for the 3,000 bunkers at NAD. In September 1930, and during World War II, 600 Marines were assigned to the facility. In 1977, that number had been reduced to 117; security is now contracted to a private company.

The mission and functions at NAD remained the same throughout the facility's history. The mission, as stated in a 1962 Navy Command History, was to "receive, renovate, maintain, store and issue ammunition, explosives, expendable ordnance items and/or weapons and technical ordnance material and perform additional tasks as directed by the Bureau of Naval Weapons." Stored ammunition that had been examined and repacked was given the code HAW followed by the last two digits of the year (e.g., HAW 50).

In 1977, NAD was transferred to the Army and renamed the Hawthorne Army Ammunition Plant (HWAAP). In 1980, HWAAP was redesignated as a government-owned contractor-operated facility. Day & Zimmermann Hawthorne Corporation (DZHC) is the current operating contractor (D&Z won the competition over three other bidders, namely Aerojet Services, Mason & Knight, and the British-owned ICI America, by proposing the lowest price for the plant's operation, the award was announced on 5 August 1980). In 1994, the facility received its current name of the Hawthorne Army Depot (HWAD).

In 1998–1999, the facility was used to destroy the U.S. stockpile of M687 chemical artillery shells and separate from them their 505 tons (458 metric tons) of binary precursor chemicals.

In May 2005, the facility was included on the 2005 Base Realignment and Closure list, with closure being recommended.  However, the depot was subsequently dropped from the BRAC list, primarily due to the base's training capability in support of pre-deployment training for OEF-bound Marine Corps units (by MWTC), Navy, and Army SOF.

On 18 March 2013, seven U.S. Marines were killed, and at least eight were wounded when a mortar exploded during a live-fire training exercise. Because of the accident, the Pentagon suspended the shell pending an investigation. Following investigation, the explosion was deemed to have been as a result of human error and the suspension was lifted.

Currently, Reserve Marines from the 4th Marine Logistics Group (4th MLG) conduct annual training exercises at the Hawthorne Army Depot as well as surrounding desert areas.

Local community 
Hawthorne Army Depot surrounds the small town of Hawthorne, Nevada, where most of its employees reside.  Before the facility became contractor-operated, it was staffed primarily by civil service workers and military personnel, who were housed on government-owned property neighboring Hawthorne, including the now-abandoned town of Babbitt and military housing known as Schweer Drive. The housing in Babbitt was made up of large buildings created to be duplexes. The system of trusses allowed all interior walls to be removed without compromising their structure. Since the disposal of Babbitt many of these "Babbitt Houses" have found their way throughout rural Nevada, filling several uses. 
During the peak of operations in World War II, additional housing was provided in a former Civilian Conservation Corps camp christened "Camp Jumbo", and in a large adjoining construction camp.  The local Sixth Street School (whose building is listed on the National Register of Historic Places) was expanded to serve the population growth.

References

External links

Joint Munitions Command website
Hawthorne bunkers from the air
More about the Hawthorne Airport & Army Depot History

 and

United States Army logistics installations
Ammunition depots of the U.S. Department of Defense
Buildings and structures in Mineral County, Nevada
United States chemical weapons depots
Military installations in Nevada
Historic American Engineering Record in Nevada
United States Marine Corps
1930 establishments in Nevada
Military installations established in 1930